Anthony Fitzhardinge Gueterbock, 18th Baron Berkeley, Baron Gueterbock,  (born 20 September 1939), otherwise known as Tony Berkeley, is a British aristocrat and Labour parliamentarian.

Holder of an ancient English hereditary peerage title created in 1421, Lord Berkeley sits in the House of Lords by virtue of being created a life peer in 2000.

Background 
Of German patrilineal descent, the Güterbocks hailed from Berlin and its environs in former East Germany.

His mother, The Hon. Cynthia Ella Foley (1909–1991), married 4 August 1937 Brigadier Ernest Gueterbock, after which she was styled The Hon. Mrs Gueterbock.
The younger of the two daughters of the 16th Baroness Berkeley MBE, her elder sister succeeded as Mary, 17th Baroness Berkeley (died 1992).

Life 
Gueterbock was educated at Eton College, before going up to Trinity College, Cambridge, where he graduated as a BA (proceeding MA). He then took a career in civil engineering with George Wimpey plc as an engineer until 1985. For the next ten years he worked as an engineer for Eurotunnel 1985–95.

Gueterbock inherited his maternal ancestors' ancient title of Baron Berkeley in 1992, succeeding his aunt Mary Foley-Berkeley, 17th Baroness Berkeley. Lord Berkeley additionally became Baron Gueterbock, of Cranford in the London Borough of Hillingdon, in 2000, but remains known in Parliament as Lord Berkeley. His life peerage enables him to continue sitting as a Labour peer in the House of Lords, following the ejection of the vast majority of hereditary peers in 1999; he was not elected a hereditary representative peer.

Since his introduction to the House of Lords in 1992, Lord Berkeley has served as Opposition Spokesperson for Transport 1996–97 and Opposition Whip 1996–97. He is the Secretary of the All-Party Parliamentary Cycling Group and has tabled many questions in the House of Lords on Transport policy, including about bicycles on trains. Berkeley has also tabled questions about police conduct with regards to civil liberties. Berkeley queried restrictions on peers bringing guests into the House of Lords during President Barack Obama's visit to London.

Lord Berkeley served as Chairman of the Rail Freight Group, the industry representative body for the rail freight sector, and is elected as a board member of the European Rail Freight Association. He is also a Trustee of Plymouth Marine Laboratory, President of the UK Maritime Pilots' Association.

Appointed an OBE in 1989 "for services to the construction industry", Lord and Lady Berkeley divide their time between homes in London and Polruan, Cornwall.

In 2019 Berkeley became Vice-Chairman of the All Party Parliamentary Group on Whistleblowing.  He was named as Co-Chair when the group reconstituted in 2020.   All current and former members of the group have been subject to criticism from some campaigners on whistleblowing law reform, questioning their transparency and accountability, following Sir Norman Lamb's resignation from the group.

Arms

See also 
 House of Lords

References

External links 
 Debrett's People of Today
 Profile at UK Parliament Website
 www.berkeley-castle.com

1939 births
Living people
People educated at Eton College
Alumni of Trinity College, Cambridge
People from Fowey
Labour Party (UK) life peers
18
British businesspeople
Officers of the Order of the British Empire
Anthony
Labour Party (UK) hereditary peers
Life peers created by Elizabeth II
Berkeley